Berrouaghia District is a district of Médéa Province, Algeria.

The district is further divided into 3 municipalities:
Berrouaghia
Rebaia
Ouled Deide

Districts of Médéa Province